Torbenia wojtusiaki, the Wojtusiak's glasswing, is a butterfly in the family Lycaenidae. It is found in Ivory Coast, Ghana and western Nigeria. The habitat consists of forests.

Adults feed on extrafloral nectaries on Marantochloa shoots.

References

Butterflies described in 2000
Poritiinae